Spring Lake is an unincorporated community in Lake Jessie Township, Itasca County, Minnesota, United States; located within the Chippewa National Forest.

The community is located six miles west of Talmoon; at the junction of Itasca County Roads 4 and 29.

Nearby places include Bowstring, Talmoon, and Marcell.  Spring Lake is located 26 miles north of Deer River; and 12 miles east of Squaw Lake.  Spring Lake is 10 miles southeast of Wirt.

Spring Lake has a post office with ZIP code 56680.

References

 Mn/DOT map of Itasca County – Sheet 2 – 2011 edition

Unincorporated communities in Itasca County, Minnesota
Unincorporated communities in Minnesota